Joel Salinas (born July 11, 1983) is an American-born Nicaraguan neurologist, writer, and researcher, who is currently an Assistant Professor of Neurology at Harvard Medical School. He practices general neurology, with subspecialty in behavioral neurology and neuropsychiatry, at the Massachusetts General Hospital in Boston, Massachusetts. He is also a clinician-scientist at the Harvard T.H. Chan School of Public Health and the Framingham Study at the Boston University School of Medicine.

The subject of his 2017 book, Mirror Touch: A Memoir of Synesthesia and the Secret Life of the Brain is a collection of patient case histories and his personal experience with multiple forms of synesthesia, including mirror-touch synesthesia.

Early life and education 

Salinas was born in Miami Beach, Florida to Nicaraguan immigrants granted political asylum during the Contra War of the Nicaraguan Revolution. He grew up in Miami, Florida with his younger brother and sister, though he spent a formative period in Managua, Nicaragua, after his parents declared bankruptcy under financial strain and temporarily returned to Nicaragua. He was recognized as the Miami-Dade County Student of the Year in 2000 and graduated valedictorian from Miami Southridge Senior High School in 2001.

Salinas earned his Bachelor of Arts magna cum laude in biology and society from Cornell University in 2005. While an undergraduate, he performed research in the Amazon rainforest of Pará, Brazil, studying the methyl-mercury contamination and ethnography of the Gorotire Kayapo watershed, which he described in his honors thesis dissertation on the sociocultural influences that affect people’s response to health risks.

Salinas graduated with a medical degree from the University of Miami School of Medicine in 2011. In 2006, while in medical school, a tumor over his right brain was discovered. When successfully resected, the tumor was discovered to be vascular. The tumor was fortunately also benign and its invasion was isolated to destroying the overlying skull bone. From 2008 to 2009, he spent a year as a Doris Duke Clinical Research Fellow in neuropsychiatric imaging at the University of Iowa’s Carver College of Medicine, where he suffered a devastating car accident. He also completed a joint MD-MBA program, earning a Master of Business Administration in Health Sector Policy and Management at the University of Miami Business School and winning the University of Miami Annual Business Plan Competition’s Grand Prize.

Salinas completed his neurology residency at Harvard Medical School from 2011 to 2015, training at Massachusetts General Hospital and Brigham and Women’s Hospital. He served as chief resident in neurology, followed by a fellowship in Behavioral Neurology and Neuropsychiatry at Massachusetts General Hospital. He earned a Master of Science in Epidemiology at the Harvard T.H. Chan School of Public Health in 2016.

Career 

After completing his fellowship, Salinas joined the staff of the Massachusetts General Hospital’s Neurology Department, serving as neurologist in the Cognitive Behavioral Neurology Unit and the Institute for Brain Health.

Research 

Salinas’s research focuses on reducing the negative impact of stroke, dementia, and brain aging by harnessing insights gained from integrating epidemiology, social and behavioral sciences, and digital phenotyping (i.e., the moment-by-moment quantification of the individual-level human phenotype in daily life using data from smartphones and other personal digital devices).

Bibliography

Mirror Touch 
Mirror Touch: A Memoir of Synesthesia and the Secret Life of the Brain (2017)  is a blend of intimate memoir and scientific exploration about Salinas's experience living with various types of synesthesia (including mirror-touch synesthesia), while sharing lessons about the brain and what it means to be human through personal case histories in neurodiversity.

Honors and awards 

Salinas’s awards include the American Academy of Neurology's Robert Katzman Research Training Fellowship Award in Alzheimer’s and Dementia Research in 2017.

Personal life 

Salinas lives in Long Island City, New York. His parents are Norma and Armando. His younger brother is Rainier and his younger sister is Scarlett.

References

External links
 Official website
 Joel Salinas on Facebook
 Joel Salinas on Twitter
 Salinas Lab

American medical researchers
American people of Nicaraguan descent
Harvard Medical School faculty
Hispanic and Latino American writers
American LGBT writers
Massachusetts General Hospital faculty
Physicians of Massachusetts General Hospital
People from Miami
People from Miami Beach, Florida
Synesthesia
University of Miami Business School alumni
1983 births
American neurologists
American medical writers
Cornell University alumni
Harvard School of Public Health alumni
LGBT physicians
Living people
Massachusetts General Hospital fellows
Massachusetts General Hospital residents
People from Miami-Dade County, Florida
Writers from Boston
Leonard M. Miller School of Medicine alumni